The Philippines national esports team represents the Philippines in international esports tournaments. It is organized under the Philippine Esports Organization.

History
A national esports team representing the Philippines took part in the 2017 Asian Indoor and Martial Arts Games in Turkmenistan, where the esports was held as a demonstration event. The Philippines did not have any esports representatives at the 2018 Asian Games in Indonesia, where it was likewise held as a demonstration event.

When the Philippines hosted the 2019 Southeast Asian Games, it organized esports as a medal sport. A national esports team, under the moniker "Sibol," was formalized by the Philippine Southeast Asian Games Esports Union (PSEU) for the purpose of the Philippines' participation in the regional games as hosts. The PSEU consists of officials of the National Electronic Sports Federation of the Philippines (NESFP) and the Esports National Association of the Philippines (ESNAP). Sibol fielded teams in all six events.

In 2020, the Philippine Esports Organization (PESO) was recognized by the Philippine Olympic Committee (POC) as the national sports association for esports in the Philippines. This recognition was disputed by the NESFP, which was involved in the PSEU. The other involved organization, ESNAP, already merged with PESO.

Sibol took part again in the 2021 Southeast Asian Games in Vietnam, where esports returned as a medal event. It intends to compete in all titles at the regional games. A national selection tournaments were held for each title, wherein the winning team from each selection would form the core of the Sibol lineup for their respective event. The qualifiers ended on February 28, 2022, and a total of 55 esports athletes represented the country. The campaign ended with two gold and two silver medals; which was considered as a success by PESO.

The team will participate in the 2023 Southeast Asian Games in Cambodia.

Team image
The Philippine esports team is also known as Team Sibol (stylized as SIBOL). The name "sibol" comes from the Filipino word for growth. The team logo is in red, yellow, and blue. The shape of the logo forms the abbreviation for the country, "PHI," in a form that could represent a leaf or a flame.

Titles
The Philippine esports team has fielded teams and/or players for the following titles.

Arena of Valor – 2019 SEAG
Crossfire – 2021 SEAG
Dota 2 – 2017 AIMAG*, 2019 SEAG
FIFA Online – 2021 SEAG
Hearthstone – 2017 AIMAG*, 2019 SEAG
The King of Fighters – 2017 AIMAG*
League of Legends – 2021 SEAG
League of Legends – 2021 SEAG
Mobile Legends: Bang Bang – 2019 SEAG, 2021 SEAG, IeSF 2022
PUBG Mobile – 2021 SEAG
Starcraft II – 2017 AIMAG*, 2019 SEAG
Tekken 7 – 2019 SEAG

Current teams
This 2021 Southeast Asian Games Dota 2 and Starcraft are not included in the Esports event in Hanoi, Vietnam. The Phase 2 qualifiers started on January 27–30, 2022 in the Esports event Mobile Legends: Bang Bang; February 1–4 in League of Legends: Wild Rift, February 12–13 in Crossfire, February 17–20 in League of Legends, and February 18–19 in FIFA Online 4. Meanwhile, Sibol held deliberation who among the top finishers of PUBG Mobile Pro League Season 5 PH Qualifier will be considered for their PUBG Mobile roster.

Crossfire 
Pacific Macta Infirma is the representative of the Philippines in the Crossfire tournament of 2021 Southeast Asian Games. The team secured their spot after winning the Sibol CF qualifiers.

FIFA Online 4 
Sibol's FIFA Online 4 lineup is composed of individuals that gone through its qualifiers.

League of Legends 
West Point Esports secured the Sibol spot after winning the 2022 Sibol Mobile Legends National Team Selection tournament.

League of Legends: Wild Rift 
A National Team Selection tournament was held to determine the two teams which would represent the Philippines at the 2021 Southeast Asian Games for the League of Legends Wild Rift event.

Mobile Legends: Bang Bang 
Blacklist International secured the rights to represent the Philippines at the 2021 Southeast Asian Games after winning the 2022 Sibol Mobile Legends National Team Selection tournament.

After winning the against the amateur team, Gamelab on 2023 Sibol Mobile Legends National Team. Bren Esports once again chosen to become Philippine representative in the 2023 Southeast Asian Games after the 2019 Southeast Asian Games.

PUBG Mobile 
After their deliberation of the top finishers in the PUBG Mobile Pro League Season 5 PH Qualifier, Sibol has chosen KHI Esports and Zap Battlegroundz, as representatives of the Philippines in the PUBG Mobile tournament of 2021 Southeast Asian Games.

Medal count

External links

References

Esports
National team
Esports teams established in 2017
2017 establishments in the Philippines